Bhavatharani Raja is an Indian singer and music composer. She is the daughter of Ilaiyaraaja and her brothers are the noted film composers Karthik Raja and Yuvan Shankar Raja. She has mostly sung songs under the direction of her father and brothers. She was awarded the National Film Award for Best Female Playback Singer in 2000 for her rendition of the song "Mayil Pola Ponnu Onnu" from the film Bharathi, composed by her father Ilaiyaraaja.

Career
Bhavatharini Raja made her debut as a singer for Raasaiya. Her song was a major hit. From then onward, she has sung in albums composed by her father and brothers.

She has also lent her voice in songs composed by Deva and Sirpy.

In 2001, she won the National Award for the song Mayil Pola Ponnu Onnu in the movie Bharathi (the music director was her father).

She turned music director for the 2002 film Mitr, My Friend, directed by Revathi, starring Shobhana. She then forayed into the Telugu film industry with Avunaa. She has also composed music for Phir Milenge, directed by Revathi, starring Shilpa Shetty, Abhishek Bachchan and Salman Khan. In June 2012, she was roped in to score the tunes for Vellachi, a village-based project.

Personal life
She is married to an advertising executive, R. Sabariraj, son of S.N. Ramachandran. Ramachandran is a former journalist who went into publishing and started Kannan Advertising. Bhavatharani studied at Rosary Matric School in Chennai.

Notable filmography
 1984: My Dear Kuttichathan (Malayalam)
 1995 Raasaiyya
 1996 Alexander
 1997 Thedinen Vanthathu
 1997  Karuvelam Pookkal
 1997: Kadhalukku Mariyadhai
 1998: Kaliyoonjal (Malayalam)
 1999 Time
 2000: Bharathi (National Film Award for Best Female Playback Singer)
 2001: Azhagi
 2001: Friends
 2005: Oru Naal Oru Kanavu
 2005: Ponmudipuzhayorathu (Malayalam)
 2006: Azhagai Irukkirai Bayamai Irukkirathu
 2006: Thaamirabharani
 2007: Naalaiya Pozhuthum Unnodu
 2008: Uliyin Osai
 2008: Dhanam
 2009: Paa
 2010: Goa
 2011: Mankatha
 2012: Gundello Godari (Telugu)
 2014: Anegan

As music director
 2002:  Mitr, My Friend
 2003: Avunaa (Telugu)
 2004: Phir Milenge (Hindi)(additional composer and BGM)
 2005: Geeya Geeya (Kannada)
 2006: Amirtham
 2006: Ilakkanam 
 2012: Vellachi
 2012: Porida Pazhagu
 2018: Kalvargal
 2019: Maayanadhi

References

External links
 

Living people
Tamil musicians
Tamil playback singers
Indian women playback singers
Musicians from Tamil Nadu
Tamil Nadu State Film Awards winners
Indian film score composers
Women film score composers
21st-century Indian composers
Indian Tamil people
Indian women songwriters
21st-century Indian women singers
21st-century Indian singers
Best Female Playback Singer National Film Award winners
Singers from Tamil Nadu
Women musicians from Tamil Nadu
21st-century Indian women musicians
Year of birth missing (living people)
21st-century women composers